IMV may stand for:

Medicine
 Inferior mesenteric vein
 Intermittent mechanical ventilation

Other
 Industrija motornih vozil, a car manufacturer in Slovenia
 Infantry mobility vehicle
 Toyota IMV platform

See also

 
 
 
 im5
 1MV
 LMV (disambiguation)
 MV (disambiguation)